Sahaliyania (from "black" in Manchu, a reference to the Amur/Heilongjiang River) is a genus of lambeosaurine hadrosaurid dinosaur (crested duckbilled dinosaur) from the Late Cretaceous of Heilongjiang, China.

Discovery
 
 
Its remains were found in a bonebed in the Maastrichtian-age Yuliangze Formation, alongside rarer remains of the hadrosaurine hadrosaurid (flat-headed duckbill) Wulagasaurus. Sahaliyania was named by Pascal Godefroit and colleagues in 2008. It is one of several hadrosaurids from the Amur River region named since 2000. The type and only species to date is S. elunchunorum, named in honor of the Elunchun people.

Sahaliyania is based on GMH W453, a partial  skull. Godefroit and colleagues assigned numerous other fossils from the bonebed to their new genus, representing much of the skull, pectoral girdle, upper arm, and pelvis. It can be distinguished from other hadrosaurids by a variety of anatomical details.  Godefroit and colleagues performed a phylogenetic analysis that places Sahaliyania as a lambeosaurine of uncertain relationships. As a hadrosaurid, Sahaliyania would have been an herbivore.

A 2022 article reassessed Sahaliyania and considered it a junior synonym of Amurosaurus.

See also

 Timeline of hadrosaur research

References

Late Cretaceous dinosaurs of Asia
Lambeosaurines
Fossil taxa described in 2008
Taxa named by Pascal Godefroit
Ornithischian genera
Nomina dubia